Strattis srilankaiensis, is a species of weevil found in Sri Lanka.

Description
Body length is about 4.42 to 6.73 mm. Integument dark brown with dense dusty greyish scales. Elytra dark brown basally at interstriae 1 to 3, but becomes whitish apically near pronotum. Head is without any distinct punctures, whereas frons set with punctures, and brown scales. Rostrum is broad, almost straight with punctures and few scales basally. The remaining area with fine punctures in female, but rugose in male. In male there is a smooth, shining median line. . Antennae slightly pale brown in color. Funicle segments covered with fine, elongate, and brown setae. Pronotum strongly transverse, broad, and round. Dorsum without any median carina, with slightly rounded apex, and bisinuate base. Scutellum bare, subsquadrate, and finely granulate.

References 

Curculionidae
Insects of Sri Lanka
Beetles described in 2016